The EuroBasket Women Most Valuable Player Award is a FIBA award given every two years, to the Most Outstanding player throughout the tournament.

Winners

See also
 FIBA EuroBasket Women All-Tournament Team
 FIBA Women's Basketball World Cup Most Valuable Player
 FIBA Women's Basketball World Cup All-Tournament Team
 FIBA Awards

References 

Most Valuable Player
Basketball trophies and awards